The 2013 Three National Figure Skating Championships included the Czech Republic, Slovakia, and Poland. The event was hosted by the Polish association in Cieszyn on December 14–16, 2012. Medals were awarded in the disciplines of men's singles, ladies' singles, pair skating, and ice dancing on the senior level. A few junior and novice-level events were also held.

The results were split by country; the three highest-placing skaters from each country in each discipline formed their national podiums. The results were among the criteria used to determine international assignments. It was the fifth consecutive season that the three countries held their national championships jointly.

Medals summary

Czech Republic

Slovakia

Poland

Senior results

Men

Ladies

Pairs

Ice dancing

Junior results

Ice dancing

References

External links
 2013 Three National Championships results
 2013 Polish Junior Championships results
 Polish Figure Skating Association 
 Czech Figure Skating Association 
 Slovak Figure Skating Association 
 Official Youtube channel

Three Nationals Figure Skating Championships, 2013
Czech Figure Skating Championships
Slovak Figure Skating Championships
Polish Figure Skating Championships
2012 in Czech sport
2012 in Slovak sport
2012 in Polish sport
Czech Republic–Slovakia relations